Ed Barber (born 26 April 1990) is an English professional rugby union, and former rugby league, footballer who plays as a centre for Huddersfield R.U.F.C. in the National League 2 North.

Background
Barber was born in Halifax, West Yorkshire, England.

Career
Barber has previously played for the Western Suburbs Rosellas, Dewsbury Rams and the Swinton Lions.

Controversies

On 30th July 2020, Barber posted a tweet about new lockdown restrictions, leading to the RFL asking him for an explanation.

References

External links
Halifax Panthers profile
Halifax profile

1990 births
Living people
Dewsbury Rams players
English rugby league players
English rugby union players
Halifax R.L.F.C. players
Huddersfield R.U.F.C. players
Rugby league five-eighths
Rugby league halfbacks
Rugby league locks
Rugby league players from Halifax, West Yorkshire
Rugby union players from Halifax, West Yorkshire
Swinton Lions players
Western Suburbs Rosellas players